Silvanus Goi Wani (1915–1998) was an Anglican archbishop who served in Uganda.

Wani was ordained in 1944. He served in the Upper Nile region from 1942 to 1961, including two years as a Chaplain to the Armed Forces during World war Two. He was diocesan secretary of Northern Uganda from 1961 to 1964. He was consecrated as an assistant bishop of Northern Uganda in 1964. He was translated to Madi and West Nile in 1969. He became archbishop in 1977, serving until 198

References

20th-century Anglican bishops in Uganda
20th-century Anglican archbishops
Bulwalasi Theological College alumni
Anglican bishops of Madi and West Nile
1915 births
1998 deaths